The Kosciusko School District is a public school district based in Kosciusko, Mississippi.

Schools
Kosciusko Senior High School (Grades 9-12). Football player Marc Woodard went on to Mississippi State University and became a player on the Philadelphia Eagles team. Whippets are the school mascot. Maroon and white are the school colors.
Kosciusko Junior High School (Grades 6-8) 
Kosciusko Upper Elementary School (Grades 4-5)
Kosciusko Middle Elementary School (Grades 2-3)
Kosciusko Lower Elementary School (Grades K-1)
Kosciusko PreSchool School (Grades Preschool)

Demographics

2006-07 school year
There were a total of 2,169 students enrolled in the Kosciusko School District during the 2006–2007 school year. The gender makeup of the district was 48% female and 52% male. The racial makeup of the district was 47.26% African American, 50.62% White, 1.57% Hispanic, 0.51% Asian, and 0.05% Native American. 50.9% of the district's students were eligible to receive free lunch.

Previous school years

Accountability statistics

See also
List of school districts in Mississippi

References

Education in Attala County, Mississippi
School districts in Mississippi
Kosciusko, Mississippi